Brian Hayes (born 25 September 1990) is an Irish rugby union player. He captained Christian Brothers College to the Munster Schools Senior Cup title in 2009.

Munster
He moved from the Munster Sub-Academy to the Munster Rugby Academy at the start of the 2010–11 season. Hayes made his full Munster debut against a touring Australia side in November 2010. His second cap for Munster came against Newport Gwent Dragons, also in November 2010. He started for Munster A when they won the 2011–12 British and Irish Cup on 27 April 2012.

Aurillac
Hayes joined French Rugby Pro D2 side Stade Aurillacois Cantal Auvergne, better known as Aurillac, for the 2013–14 season, in an attempt to gain more gametime.

References

External links
Munster Profile
U20 Six Nations Profile

Living people
1990 births
People educated at Christian Brothers College, Cork
Rugby union players from County Cork
Irish rugby union players
Cork Constitution players
Munster Rugby players
Rugby union locks